{{Infobox university
 | name                   = University of Malakand
 | native_name            = جامعہ مالاکنڈ
 | image                  = UOM-Logo.jpeg
 | image_size             = 260px
 | image_alt              = 
 | caption                = An aerial view of Malakand University
 | latin_name             = 
 | motto                  = Bridging the gap between aspirations and achievements.
 | motto_lang             = English
 | mottoeng               = ''University at Glance... | established            = 
 | type                   = Public
 | affiliation            = 
 | endowment              = 
 | budget                 = 
 | officer_in_charge      = 
 | chairman               = 
 | chancellor             = Governor of Khyber Pakhtunkhwa
 | president              = 
 | vice-president         = 
 | superintendent         = 
 | provost                = Muhammad Shoaib
 | vice_chancellor        = Rashid Ahmad
 | principal              = 
 | dean                   = 
 | director               = 
 | head_label             = Director Administration
 | head                   = Ezzat Khan
 | academic_staff         = 
 | administrative_staff   = Muhammad Nasim
 | students               = 7500
 | undergrad              = 4300
 | postgrad               = ~700
 | doctoral               = 150
 | other                  = 
 | city                   = Chakdara, Lower Dir District, Khyber Pakhtunkhwa
 | country                = Pakistan
 | coor                   = 
 | campus                 = Ramorra, Chakdara
 | former_names           = 
 | colours                =  Green, gold, cyan
 | other_name             = UoM
 | mascot                 = 
 | accreditation          = Higher Education Commission of Pakistan
 | website                = 
 | logo                   = 
 | footnotes              = 
}}

The University of Malakand; abbreviated as UOM''') is a public university located at the bank of the Swat River in Chakdara, Lower Dir District of Khyber Pakhtunkhwa, Pakistan. Founded in 2001, the university offers undergraduate and postgraduate degrees in various academic disciplines. In 2010, the university was ranked "seventh" best university (in the general category) by the Higher Education Commission of Pakistan.

Background 
The need for a university in Malakand Division had been felt since 1972, but the idea could not materialize until 2001. The university was established at village Ramora in a vast and beautiful land rested with Forest Department. The university has acquired more land reaching nearly 300 acres surrounded by fenced boundary walls (about 7 km). The university is located in the centre hub of Malakand Division, linked with District Swat, Lower and Upper Dir, Chitral, and Malakand.

Distinctions
The 2020 QS world rankings placed the University of Malakand as the top university in Khyber Pakhtunkhwa, ninth highest (and overall 17th) in Pakistan, and among the top 351–400 in Asia.

Vice Chancellors 
 Prof. Dr. Jehandar Shah - December 2001 – 2007) 
 Prof. Dr. Mohammad Iqbal (September 2007 − April 2008)
 Prof. Dr. Rasul Jan (April 2008 − 2013)
 Prof. Dr. Johar Ali (2013-2017)
 Prof. Dr. Rahmat Ali (November 2017)
 Prof. Dr. Gul Zaman (October 2017 – Dec 2021)
 Prof. Dr. Rashid Ahmad (December 2021 – present)

Convocations 
The convocations for the Bachelor of Science (Hons) and Bachelor of Arts (Hons) have been held on the following dates:

 1. Session (2001–2005), Date 10 Feb 2007
 2. Session (2002–2006),
 3. Session (2003–2007),
 4. Session (2004–2008), Date 28 June 2012
 5. Session (2005–2009),
 6. Session (2006–2010),
 7. Session (2007-2011), Date 15 Oct 2012

Currently, Master of Science and Master of Arts programmes are also ongoing but no convocation has been held for them.

Departments 
 Department of Chemistry
 Department of Biotechnology
 Department of Biochemistry
 Department of Botany
 Department of Computer Science & IT
 Department of Economics
 Department of Education
 Department of English
 Department of Geology
 Department of Islamic Studies
 Department of Journalism and Mass Communication
 Department of Law
 Department of Management Studies
 Department of Mathematics
 Department of Pashto and Oriental Languages
 Department of Political Science
 Department of Pharmacy
 Department of Physics
 Department of Psychology
 Department of Sociology/Social Work
 Department of Software Engineering
 Department of Statistics
 Department of Tourism and Hotel Management
 Department of Zoology

References

External links 
Official website

Public universities and colleges in Khyber Pakhtunkhwa
Educational institutions established in 2001
2001 establishments in Pakistan
Malakand District